Patrick Esume (/e:'su:mə/) - born 3 February 1974, in Hamburg, West Germany) is a German American Football coach, commentator, TV-announcer and former player. He is the Commissioner of the European League of Football which started play in 2021.

Career

As a player
Esume started playing for the :de:Hamburg Silver Eagles in 1992 staying with the team until its dissolution in 1995 when he switched to the Hamburg Blue Devils reaching the German Bowl thrice during his time there (winning once) and winning the Eurobowl three times. He ended his player career after the 2000 season and subsequently became a coach.

As a trainer
Patrick Esume worked as a so-called "National Coach" (a Coach from the host nations of the mostly US-based and coached teams) of the NFL Europe from 2002 starting with Frankfurt Galaxy the team winning the World Bowl in the subsequent 2003 season. In 2005 he switched to the Hamburg Sea Devils working as a running back coach and special teams coordinator. Having won two NFL Minority Coaching Fellowships for the 2006 and 2007 seasons, Esume worked with the Oakland Raiders and the Cleveland Browns during their respective training camps. Esume's team, the Hamburg Sea Devils, also won the last ever World Bowl in 2007. Following the dissolution of NFL Europe, Esume switched to the Ligue Élite de Football Américain team La Courneuve Flash leading them to a French championship in 2009 with him as Head Coach. Going back to Germany after one season in France, he became Head Coach of the Kiel Baltic Hurricanes, then playing in the German Football League and led them to win the 2010 edition of the German Bowl. He left  his position in Kiel after the 2014 season and became Head Coach of the French National American Football team later that year, leading them to a gold medal at the 2017 World Games and the 2018 European Championship of American Football triumph.

TV career
Starting with the 2015 NFL Season, Esume has been working for :de:ran Football as an analyst and commentator for the German transmissions of NFL games within the ProSiebenSat.1 Media one of Germany's largest private broadcasting companies.

Other ventures
In November 2020, Esume announced the founding of a new professional American football league based in Europe titled the European League of Football, which started play in 2021. Esume is to take the role of "Commissioner" with a TV-Deal with ProSiebenSat.1 Media providing financial backing and potential public interest.

Private life
Esume is married and has two children.

References

German television presenters
German sports journalists
German sports coaches
1974 births
Sportspeople from Hamburg
Living people
German sportspeople of Nigerian descent
Coaches of American football
German players of American football
German Football League players
German sports executives and administrators